The Income Tax Act 1952 (15 & 16 Geo 6 & 1 Eliz 2 c 10) was an Act of the Parliament of the United Kingdom, concerning income tax.

The whole Act was repealed by section 538(1) of, and Schedule 16 to, the Income and Corporation Taxes Act 1970, subject to the savings in Schedule 14 of that Act.

Part I - Preliminary

Section 1
As to this section, see "Income Tax" in "Students' Page" (1962) 68 Taxation 201 (16 December 1961)

Part II - Principal Provisions as to Administration, Assessment, Appeals and Collection

Section 5
In section 5(2), the words from "and unless" to the end were repealed by section 17 of, and Part I of Schedule 6 to the Income Taxes Management Act 1964.

Sections 5(3) and (4) were repealed by section 17 of, and Part I of Schedule 6 to the Income Taxes Management Act 1964.

Section 6
Sections 6(1), (2) and (5) were repealed by section 17 of, and Part I of Schedule 6 to the Income Taxes Management Act 1964.

Section 7
This section was repealed by section 17 of, and Part I of Schedule 6 to the Income Taxes Management Act 1964.

Sections 13 to 16
These sections were repealed by section 17 of, and Part I of Schedule 6 to the Income Taxes Management Act 1964.

Section 78
Section 78(4) was repealed by section 17 of, and Part I of Schedule 6 to the Income Taxes Management Act 1964.

Part IV

Section 119
Sections 119(3) and (4) were repealed by section 8 of, and Schedule 2 to, the Diplomatic Privileges Act 1964.

Section 121
The definition of "Government stock registered or inscribed in the books of the Bank of Ireland in Dublin" was repealed by section 26 of, and Schedule 9 to, the Finance Act 1964.

Part VIII

Section 228
The repeals made by the Income and Corporation Taxes Act 1970 did not affect:
this section; or
the limitation of this section by sections 400(4) and 406(6) of this Act; or
the limitation of this section by section 11(5) of the Finance Act 1969.

This section was repealed by section 1 of, and Group 1 of Part 10 of Schedule 1 to, the Statute Law (Repeals) Act 2013.

Part XVIII

Section 400
Section 400(4) was repealed by section 1 of, and Group 1 of Part 10 of Schedule 1 to, the Statute Law (Repeals) Act 2013.

Section 406
Section 406(6) was repealed by section 1 of, and Group 1 of Part 10 of Schedule 1 to, the Statute Law (Repeals) Act 2013.

Part XXII

Section 461
This section, so far as related to members of mission as defined in Article 1 of Schedule 1 to the Diplomatic Privileges Act 1964, was repealed by section 8 of, and Schedule 2 to, the Diplomatic Privileges Act 1964.

Part XXV

Section 510
As to this section, see (1962) 68 Taxation 341 (17 February 1962)

Part XXVI

Section 530
Section 530(1)(c) was repealed by the Schedule to the Statute Law Revision Act 1964.

Schedule 8

Part IV
The words "Government stock registered or inscribed in the books of the Bank of Ireland in Dublin" were repealed by section 26 of, and Schedule 9 to, the Finance Act 1964.

Schedule 16
The words inserted in paragraph 10, by section 20(1) of the Finance Act 1962, were repealed by section 26 of, and Schedule 9 to, the Finance Act 1964, subject to section 16(4) of that Act.

Schedule 17
The words inserted in paragraph 3, by section 20(1) of the Finance Act 1962, were repealed by section 26 of, and Schedule 9 to, the Finance Act 1964, subject to section 16(4) of that Act.

See also
Taxation in the United Kingdom

References
Butterworths' Legal Editorial Staff. Handbook on the Income Tax Act, 1952. (Simon's Income Tax). Butterworth & Co (Publishers) Ltd. London. 1952. Reviewed at "Reviews" in "Law Library" (1952) 213 The Law Times 206 (10 April 1952); "Legal Literature" (1952) 102 The Law Journal 250 (2 May 1952); "Reviews" (1952) 116 Justice of the Peace and Local Government Review 474 (26 July 1952); (1952) 86 The Irish Law Times 222 (13 September 1952)
H G S Plunkett (ed). The Income Tax Act, 1952, Annotated. Sweet & Maxwell. Stevens & Sons. London. W Green & Son. Edinburgh. Carswell Company. Toronto. 1952. Reviewed at "Literature" in "The Pleader" (1952) 68 Scottish Law Review and Sheriff Court Reports 189  ; "Reviews and Notices" (1952) 30 The Canadian Bar Review 543.
N E Mustoe. Guide to Income Tax. Butterworth & Co (Publishers) Ltd. 1952. Reviewed at (1952) 96 The Solicitors' Journal 409 (28 June 1952); "Law Library" (1952) 214 The Law Times 77 (8 August 1952)
"The Income Tax Act 1952". Halsbury's Statutes of England. Second Edition. Butterworth & Co (Publishers) Ltd. Bell Yard, Temple Bar, London. 1952. Volume 31 (The Income Tax Act 1952). Passim.
John Burke (ed). "Income Tax Act, 1952". Current Law Statutes Annotated 1952. Sweet & Maxwell. Stevens & Sons. London. W Green & Son. Edinburgh. 1952. Chapter 10. Google
Current Law Income Tax Acts Service (CLITAS). Sweet & Maxwell. Stevens & Sons. London. W Green & Son. Edinburgh. Carswell Company. Toronto. 1952. (looseleaf). Reviewed at "Legal Literature" (1952) 102 The Law Journal 501 (5 September 1952)
A C Monahan. A Comprehensive Index to the Income Tax Act, 1952. Solicitors Law Stationery Society Ltd. London. 1952. Reviewed at (1952) 86 The Irish Law Times 222 (13 September 1952); Accountancy, vols 63 & 64, p 176
John Gilbert (comp). Index to Income Tax Act, 1952. Barkeley Book Company Ltd. Stanmore. Reviewed at Accountancy, vols 63 & 64, p 209; (1952) 127 The Accountant 131 (2 August 1952)
Taxation. Volumes 63 to 65 and 66 (1960). Passim. See also other volumes of this periodical.
"The Income Tax Act, 1952" (1952) 19 The Solicitor 114 (May 1952)
"Income Tax Act, 1952" (1952) 214 The Law Times 139 (12 September 1952)
"Income Tax Act, 1952, 15 & 16 Geo. 6 & 1 Eliz. 2, c. 10" (1952) 102 The Law Journal 161 (21 March 1952)
Beattie. The Elements of Income Tax Law. 2nd Ed. 1953. 3rd Ed. 1957. 4th Ed. 1960. 5th Ed. 1962. The Elements of Income Tax and Profits Tax Law. 6th Ed. Stevens & Sons. 1963. Elements of the Law of Income and Capital Gains Taxation. 7th Ed. 1966. Second impression. 1967. Passim. Reviewed at 9 Journal of the Society of Public Teachers of Law 273.
"Income Tax and Profits Tax". Halsbury's Laws of England. (The Laws of England). Third Edition. Butterworth & Co (Publishers) Ltd. 1952. Volume 20. Passim.
The English and Empire Digest. Volume 28. Revised Edition. Title "Income Tax".
Philip Frederick Skottowe (rev ed). H W Clements and A S Diamond (eds). Butterworths Income Tax Digest: being a Reprint of the Title "Income Tax" from the Revised Edition of Volume 28 of the English and Empire Digest. Butterworths. London. 1960.

Income tax in the United Kingdom
United Kingdom Acts of Parliament 1952